Heo Jeok (Korean: 허적, Hanja: 許積; 1610 – 11 May 11, 1680) was a politician during the Joseon Dynasty. He was the 124th and 125th Prime Minister of Korea (Yeonguijeong), in 1664, 1671, and 1674–1680. His pen name was Mukjae (묵재, 默齋) and Hyuong (휴옹, 休翁). He came from the Yangcheon Heo clan (양천 허씨, 陽川 許氏).

He was the leader of the Southerners faction, and a rival of Song Siyeol.

Family 
 Father 
 Heo Han (허한, 許僩) (1574 - 1642)
 Grandfather - Heo Jam (허잠, 許潛)
 Grandmother - Lady Min of the Yeoheung Min clan (여흥 민씨, 驪興 閔氏); daughter of Min Hu-yeol (민희열, 閔希說) (1510 - ?)
 Aunt - Lady Heo of the Yangcheon Heo clan (양천 허씨, 陽川 許氏); Yi Gwang-jeong's second wife
 Uncle - Yi Gwang-jeong (이광정, 李光庭) of the Yeonan Yi clan  (1552 - 1629)
 Cousin - Yi Bun (이분, 李衯)
 Cousin - Yi Ju (이주, 李裯)
 Cousin - Lady Yi of the Yeonan Yi clan (연안 이씨, 延安 李氏)
 Cousin-in-law - Min Gwang-hun (민광훈, 閔光勳) (1595 - 1659)
 Cousin - Lady Yi of the Yeonan Yi clan (연안 이씨, 延安 李氏)
 Cousin-in-law - Park Mun-bin (박문빈, 朴文彬)
 Cousin - Lady Yi of the Yeonan Yi clan (연안 이씨, 延安 李氏)
 Cousin-in-law - Hong Woo-won (홍우원, 洪宇遠)
 Cousin - Lady Yi of the Yeonan Yi clan (연안 이씨, 延安 李氏)
 Cousin-in-law - Lee Ik-bae (이익배, 李益培)
 Cousin - Lady Yi of the Yeonan Yi clan (연안 이씨, 延安 李氏)
 Cousin-in-law - Park Ham-jang (박함장, 朴諴長)
 Cousin - Lady Yi of the Yeonan Yi clan (연안 이씨, 延安 李氏)
 Cousin-in-law - Park Su-haeng (박수행, 朴粹行)
 Mother 
 Lady Kim of the Andong Kim clan (증 정경부인 안동 김씨)
 Grandfather - Kim Je-gab (김제갑, 金悌甲)
Siblings
 Older sister - Lady Heo of the Yangcheon Heo clan (양천 허씨, 陽川 許氏)
 Brother-in-law - Shin Hang-gu (신항구, 申恒耉)
 Older brother - Heo Chi (허치, 許穉) (1604 - 1636)
 Sister-in-law - Lady Shin (신씨, 辛氏); daughter of Shin Eung-mang (신응망, 辛應望)
 Younger brother - Heo Jin (허진, 許稹)
 Younger brother - Heo Jil (허질, 許秩)
 Younger brother - Heo Je (허제, 許穧)
Wives and their children
 Lady Lee of the Gwangju Lee clan (증 정경부인 광주이씨, 廣州李氏); daughter of Lee Seo (이서) — No issue.
 Lady Min of the Yeoheung Min clan (정경부인 여흥 민씨, 驪興 閔氏); daughter of Min Ji-ik (민지익, 閔之釴) — No issue.
 Unnamed concubine 
 Son - Heo Gyeon (허견, 許堅) (1646 - 1680)
 Daughter-in-law - Lady Kim Ye-yeong (김예영) of the Cheongpung Kim clan (청풍 김씨, 淸風 金氏)
 Unnamed daughter-in-law 
 Son - Heo Hu (허후, 許厚) (1648 - ?)

Works 
 Ilgi (일기, 日記)
 Heosanggukjooui (허상국주의, 許相國奏議)

See also 
 Yesong
 Heo Mok
 Yun Hyu
 Yun Seondo

References

1610 births
1680 deaths
17th-century Korean writers
Korean politicians
Korean scholars
Korean Confucianists
Heo clan of Yangcheon